The 2010 Pan American Women's Junior Handball Championship took place in the sports complex CeNARD, in Buenos Aires from April 6 – April 10. It acts as the American qualifying tournament for the 2010 Women's Junior World Handball Championship.

Teams

Preliminary round

Group A

Group B

Placement 5th–8th

7th/8th

5th/6th

Final round

Semifinals

Bronze medal match

Gold medal match

Final standing

2010 in handball
Sports competitions in Buenos Aires
Pan American Women's Junior Handball Championship
H
Hand